Peter O'Malley (born 23 June 1965) is an Australian professional golfer.

Early life
O'Malley was born in Bathurst, New South Wales.

Amateur career
O'Malley won the Australian Junior Championship and the New Zealand Amateur in 1986.

Professional career
O'Malley turned professional in 1987. He has won several times on the PGA Tour of Australasia, but spent most of the year playing on the European Tour. He was runner-up to Mark James in his first European Tour event, the 1989 Dubai Desert Classic, and has since won three titles on the European Tour. Perhaps the most famous of these three victories was his Scottish Open win which he played the last five holes in seven under par to snatch victory. He made the top-100 on the European Tour Order of Merit every year from 1989 through to 2007, with a best ranking of tenth in 1995. His greatest strength is his accuracy, and he topped the European Tour's driving accuracy rankings in 2001 and 2002.

Personal life
O'Malley is married to Jill O'Malley and has two children, Tom and Jess.

Amateur wins
1985 New South Wales Medal
1986 Australian Junior, New Zealand Amateur, Lake Macquarie Amateur, New South Wales Amateur

Professional wins (8)

European Tour wins (3)

European Tour playoff record (0–1)

PGA Tour of Australasia wins (5)

1Co-sanctioned by the Nationwide Tour

PGA Tour of Australasia playoff record (2–2)

Results in major championships

Note: O'Malley never played in the Masters Tournament.

CUT = missed the half-way cut
"T" = tied

Summary

Most consecutive cuts made – 4 (1991 Open Championship – 1996 U.S. Open)
Longest streak of top-10s – 1 (twice)

Results in World Golf Championships

QF, R16, R32, R64 = Round in which player lost in match play
"T" = Tied

Team appearances
Amateur
Eisenhower Trophy (representing Australia): 1986
Sloan Morpeth Trophy (representing Australia): 1986 (winners)
Australian Men's Interstate Teams Matches (representing New South Wales): 1985 (winners), 1986

Professional
World Cup (representing Australia): 1992, 1998, 2000
Alfred Dunhill Cup (representing Australia): 1999, 2000

References

External links

Australian male golfers
PGA Tour of Australasia golfers
European Tour golfers
European Senior Tour golfers
Golfers from Sydney
People from Bathurst, New South Wales
People from Sunningdale
1965 births
Living people